Paul Wilkinson may refer to:
Paul Wilkinson (political scientist) (1937–2011), British political scientist
Paul Wilkinson (footballer) (born 1964), English retired footballer
Paul Pilot (born Paul Wilkinson), record producer
Xav, Irish singer, born Paul Wilkinson, see Romo